Mārtiņš Mazūrs (28 February 1908 – 30 April 1995) was a Latvian cyclist. He competed in the individual and team road race events at the 1936 Summer Olympics.

References

External links
 

1908 births
1995 deaths
Latvian male cyclists
Olympic cyclists of Latvia
Cyclists at the 1936 Summer Olympics
People from Jelgava Municipality